Mealhada is a city and a municipality located in Aveiro District in Portugal. The population in 2011 was 20,428, in an area of 110.66 km2. It had 17,043 eligible voters (2006).  The city of Mealhada itself has a population of 4,522.

It is included in the Região de Coimbra. The city of Coimbra is about 20 km away.

The current Mayor is Rui Marqueiro, elected by the Socialist Party. The municipal holiday is Ascension Day.

Demographics

Parishes 
Administratively, the municipality is divided into 6 civil parishes (freguesias):
 Barcouço
 Casal Comba
 Luso
 Mealhada, Ventosa do Bairro e Antes
 Pampilhosa
 Vacariça

Cities and towns 
 Mealhada (city) / [cidade] .
 Towns: Luso ; Pampilhosa

Villages
(Partial list):
 
 Barcouco
 Buçaco
 Casal Comba
 Mala
 Travasso
 Vacarica
 Ventosa do Bairro
 Vimieira

Attractions
The Buçaco Palace (Portuguese: Palácio Hotel do Buçaco) is a luxury hotel in the Luso parish, in the municipality of Mealhada, in the Serra do Buçaco mountains. Other interesting sights near Luso: Cruz Alta, a dense wooded forest.

Other attractions: Mealhada: City Park (Parque da Cidade de Mealhada).

Principal train stations
The most important train stations are: Pampilhosa, Mealhada and Luso.

References

External links 

 
 Photos from Mealhada

 
Municipalities of Aveiro District